The 1919 election for Mayor of Los Angeles took place on May 6, 1919, with a run-off election on June 3, 1919. Incumbent Frederic T. Woodman was defeated by Meredith P. Snyder. Snyder, the mayor of Los Angeles from 1896–98 and 1900–04, was elected to a third non-consecutive term.

Municipal elections in California, including Mayor of Los Angeles, are officially nonpartisan; candidates' party affiliations do not appear on the ballot.

Election 
After his election to a full term in 1917, incumbent Frederic T. Woodman was seeking another term in office. He faced Meredith P. Snyder, his opponent in the previous election. In March 1919, Woodman was indicted on charges of asking and receiving a bribe, and during his campaign for the election, he was arrested and tried but was later acquitted of all charges. Two months later, Woodman lost the election to Snyder.

Results

Primary election

General election

References and footnotes

External links
 Office of the City Clerk, City of Los Angeles

1919
1919 California elections
Los Angeles
1910s in Los Angeles